Joel Camargo (18 September 1946 – 23 May 2014) was a Brazilian professional footballer who played as a defender.

Club career 
Joel played for Portuguese Santista, Santos, Paris Saint-Germain, and Saad during his 10-year career. He played a total of two matches for PSG during the 1971–72 season.

International career 
Joel was a defender of the Brazil national football team when they won the 1970 FIFA World Cup. He earned 28 caps for Brazil between 1964 and 1970 (plus 10 unofficial matches).

Death 
Camargo died of kidney failure at age 67 on 23 May 2014.

References

1946 births
2014 deaths
Sportspeople from Santos, São Paulo
Brazilian footballers
1970 FIFA World Cup players
FIFA World Cup-winning players
Santos FC players
Associação Atlética Portuguesa (Santos) players
Paris Saint-Germain F.C. players
Brazil international footballers
Brazilian expatriate footballers
Expatriate footballers in France
Ligue 1 players
Association football defenders
Saad Esporte Clube players